The United Shoe Machinery Corporation Building is a historic office building at 160 Federal Street in the Financial District of Boston, Massachusetts. The steel-frame skyscraper has 24 stories and a penthouse, and was built in 1929–1930 to a design by George W. Fuller and Parker, Thomas & Rice for the United Shoe Machinery Corporation. It is one of Boston's finest Art Deco buildings, including an elaborately decorated lobby. It was built for the United Shoe Machinery Corporation, which at the time controlled 98% of the nation's shoe machinery business.

The building was listed on the National Register of Historic Places in 1980 and in 1983 it was designated a Boston Landmark with rare interior (lobby) as well as exterior protection by the Boston Landmarks Commission.

See also 
 National Register of Historic Places listings in northern Boston, Massachusetts

External links
 City of Boston, Landmarks Commission. , 1983. (Was originally listed at 140 Federal Street.)

References

Office buildings completed in 1929
Office buildings on the National Register of Historic Places in Massachusetts
Art Deco architecture in Massachusetts
Skyscraper office buildings in Boston
National Register of Historic Places in Boston
Landmarks in Financial District, Boston